Jorge Manuel Pereira Santos (born 10 March 1993 in Miragaia - Porto) known as Gazela, is a Portuguese footballer who plays for Sport Benfica e Castelo Branco, as a forward.

Football career
On 10 August 2014, Santos made his professional debut with Sporting B in a 2014–15 Segunda Liga match against Farense.

References

External links

Stats at LPFP 

1993 births
Living people
Portuguese footballers
Association football forwards
Liga Portugal 2 players
Campeonato de Portugal (league) players
Sporting CP B players
Padroense F.C. players
S.C. Salgueiros players
Gondomar S.C. players
Sport Benfica e Castelo Branco players
A.D. Sanjoanense players
Footballers from Porto